A dzsungel könyve is a Hungarian musical based on The Jungle Book. With music by László Dés, lyrics by Péter Geszti, and book by Pál Békés, it premiered on January 28, 1996 in Pesti Színház with the company of the Comedy Theatre of Budapest directed by Géza Hegedűs D. The musical won the Hungarian Theatre Award for Best Musical in that year. The original production reached its thousandth performance in 2013, and it has been produced in several Hungarian theatres.

List of musical numbers 
Act 1
"Nyitány" – company
"Farkas vagyok" – Akela, little Mowgli & company
"Beindul a pofonofon" – Baloo, Mowgli & Bagheera
"Egy majomban őrlünk" – monkeys
"Válj kővé!" – Kaa
"Mit ér a farkas?" – Akela
"Száz a kérdés" – Shere Khan
"Amíg őriz a szemed" – Baloo & Mowgli
Act 2
"Vadászok dala" – men
"Szavakat keresek" – Toona & Mowgli
"A mi emberünk" – women
"A tigris éjszakája" – Kaa & Bagheera
"Kegyelet egylet" – Chil
"Beszél a szél" – Bagheera
"Finálé" – Toona, Mowgli & company

Productions

References

The original production in Színházi Adattár
The original production at the Comedy Theatre website

1996 musicals
Hungarian musicals
Musicals based on novels
Works based on The Jungle Book